Samu is a surname. Notable people with this surname include:

 Anna Samu (born 1996), Hungarian football player
 Géza Samu (1947–1990), Hungarian sculptor
 Margaret Samu, art historian
 Pete Samu (born 1991), Australian rugby union player

See also
 Samu (given name)
 Samu (disambiguation)